Air is the debut album by post-metal band Astronoid, released in 2016 by Blood Music.

Background
After releasing an EP Stargazer in 2013, vocalist Brett Boland and bassist Daniel Schwartz recruited guitarists Casey Aylward and Mike DeMelia and drummer Matt St. Jean to create a full band lineup. After forming the full band, the group was signed to Blood Music.

The band was inspired by Devin Townsend, Ihsahn, and Emperor during this time.

The band released the songs "Air" and "Up and Atom" to promote the album before its release.

Style
The band's label described their sound as "Dream Thrash". Noisey described the album as "a buoyant mix of metal, thrash, punk, prog-rock and shoegaze.".

Allmusic described the album's sound, stating "The terms "dream thrash" and "blackgaze" could be thrown around—and it really is an exhilarating mish-mash of everything from black metal to shoegaze to thrash and even to pop-punk." The A.V. Club described it as "a soaring sound, which marries heavenly clean vocals to a warm but still blistering blur of guitar that's like black metal on a sugar rush".

Critical reception and sales

Air received nearly universal critical acclaim upon release. Writing for AllMusic, Neil Z. Yeung gave the album 4 and a  out of 5 stars, stating "overwhelmingly powerful and cathartic, Air is an album to get lost in, a single-listen journey over emotional peaks and through sonic valleys. There is so much happening at once that descriptions make it sound like a confused exercise."

Metal Sucks described the album as "an instant classic". Angry Metal Guy gave the album a positive review, stating "Air is the kind of destined-to-be-classic that conjures a world of timeless innocence and youthful wonder. This is the soundtrack to walking on the beach alone on the first day of summer... This is the sound of being old enough to know how incredible the world can be, but young enough not to have been tainted by its negativity." It Djents called the album one of the best debuts in recent memory and one of the best records of 2016. San Diego City Beat called the album one of the best of 2016 in any genre.

In its first week, the album sold 250 physical copies. 24 hours after release, it was ranked #2 on the Bandcamp metal charts. Shortly afterwards, it climbed to #1 on the metal charts and #10 on the site overall.

Accolades
Stereogum placed the album 31st on their half-way through the year rankings of the best albums of any genres through June 2016.
Consequence of Sound named the album 10th on its ranking of Top 10 Metal albums of 2016. Air was placed on the "Best of 2016" as well as "Favorite Metal Album" year end lists by Allmusic. Metal Insider named it one of the top 5 metal albums of the year so far in a June column, they later ranked it third on their Top Metal Albums of 2016 list. Metal Storm named it the best debut album of 2016.

Track listing

Personnel
Astronoid
Brett Boland - vocals
Daniel Schwartz - bass
Casey Aylward - guitar
Mike DeMellia - guitar
Matt St. Jean - drums

Production
Mixed by Brett Boland & Daniel Schwartz.
Mastered by Daniel Schwartz.
Cover art by Lully Schwartz.

References

External links

Air at Bandcamp (streamed copy where licensed)

2016 debut albums
Astronoid albums